Mowlan may refer to:
 Mowlan-e Olya, Ardabil Province
 Mowlan-e Sofla, Ardabil Province
 Mowlan, East Azerbaijan